The Cleveland International Piano Competition is an American piano competition that takes place biennially in Cleveland, Ohio. The initial Competition in 1975 and the nine others that followed were sponsored jointly by the Robert Casadesus Society and the Cleveland Institute of Music to honor the memory of French pianist Robert Casadesus. As a result, the Competition was then called the Casadesus International Piano Competition. In 1994, a new organization was formed: the Piano International Association of Northern Ohio (PIANO). Prize winners of the Cleveland International Piano Competition have included renowned artists like Nicholas Angelich, Sergei Babayan, Angela Hewitt, Daejin Kim, Antonio Pompa-Baldi, Jean-Yves Thibaudet, Kotaro Fukuma and among others.

The first Competition with the new name of "Cleveland" took place in August 1995. The 2001 Competition finals were held at Severance Hall with the Cleveland Competition Orchestra conducted by Jahja Ling. The success of this venture led to negotiations in 2003 with the Musical Arts Association resulting in the engagement of the Cleveland Orchestra to play for the four finalists at Severance Hall.

The Cleveland International Piano Competition is a member of the World Federation of International Music Competitions.

Past prize winners

See also 
List of classical music competitions

References

External links 
Cleveland International Piano Competition
 Piano Competitions & Music Competitions at Bakitone International

Music of Cleveland
Recurring events established in 1975
Piano competitions in the United States
1975 establishments in Ohio
Festivals in Cleveland